Ashin is the stage name of the Taiwanese singer Chen Hsin-hung. Ashin may also refer to
Ashin, an honorific used for monks and nobles in Burmese names
Ashin, Iran, a village
Ashin-e Sofla, a village in Iran
Ashin-e Olya, a village in Iran
Astan-e Karud, a village in Iran